Kim Sun-ja (born 16 June 1966) is a South Korean sprinter. She competed in the women's 4 × 400 metres relay at the 1988 Summer Olympics.

References

External links
 

1966 births
Living people
Athletes (track and field) at the 1988 Summer Olympics
South Korean female sprinters
South Korean female hurdlers
Olympic athletes of South Korea
Place of birth missing (living people)